Maïssa Bey is the nom de plume of Samia Benameur (born 1950), an Algerian educator and writer.

Life 
She was born in Ksar Boukhari and teaches French in Sidi-Bel-Abbès in western Algeria. In 1996, she published her first novel  Au commencement était la mer. Her story collection Nouvelles d'Algérie was published in 1998 and received the Grand Prix de la nouvelle of the Société des gens de lettres. Her 2001 novel Cette fille-là was awarded the Prix Marguerite Audoux. In 2005, she received the Grand Prix des libraires algériens for her work to date.

She was a co-founder of the Chèvre-feuille étoilée publishing house. In 2000, she helped establish Paroles et écriture, a cultural association of Algerian women.

Selected works 
 Au commencement etait la mer, novel (1996)
 Nouvelles d'Algerie, stories (1998)
 Cette fille-la, novel (2001)
 Entendez-vous dans les montagnes, novel (2002); English translation, Do You Hear in the Mountains (2018)
 Surtout ne te retourne pas, novel (2005); English translation, Above All, Don't Look Back (2009)
 Sous le jasmin la nuit, stories (2004)
 Bleu, blanc, vert, novel (2006), received the Cezam Prix Littéraire Inter CE
 Pierre, Sang, Papier ou Cendre, novel (2008), received the Grand Prix du roman francophone SILA
 L'une et l'autre, autobiography (2009)
 Puisque mon cœur est mort, novel (2009)

References 

1950 births
Living people
Algerian novelists
Algerian women short story writers
Algerian short story writers
Pseudonymous women writers
20th-century Algerian writers
20th-century Algerian women writers
21st-century Algerian writers
21st-century Algerian women writers
20th-century pseudonymous writers
21st-century pseudonymous writers